Isaac ben Jacob Lattes was a rabbi who lived in Provence. In 1340 he wrote  Toledot Yiẓḥaḳ, in which he gives valuable information concerning other Provençal authors and discusses the history of tradition. This work is known also by the name Sha'are Ẓiyyon (ed. S. Buber, Yaroslav, 1885). He wrote also Ḳiryat Sefer, a commentary on the Pentateuch (Benjacob, Oẓar ha-Sefarim; Zunz, Z. G. p. 479; S. Buber, in the preface to Sha'are Ẓiyyon).

References

External links 
Jewish Encyclopedia article for Isaac Lattes
Sha'are Ẓiyyon (ed. S. Buber, Yaroslav, 1885)

14th-century French rabbis
Provençal Jews
Year of death unknown
Year of birth unknown